Zeine is a surname. Notable people with the surname include:

Ali Lamine Zeine (born 1965), Nigerien politician and economist
Hatem Zeine, American physicist, inventor and technologist

See also
Zine (surname)